Street Fighter 6 is an upcoming fighting game developed and published by Capcom. It is planned for release for PlayStation 4, PlayStation 5, Windows, and Xbox Series X/S on June 2, 2023. An arcade version exclusive to Japan is set to be released by Taito in 2023.

Gameplay

Street Fighter 6 features three overarching game modes: Fighting Ground, World Tour, and Battle Hub. Fighting Ground contains local and online versus battles as well as training and arcade modes, all featuring similar 2D fighting gameplay to the previous games in the series, in which two fighters use a variety of attacks and special abilities to knock out their opponent. World Tour is a single-player story mode featuring a customizable player avatar exploring 3D environments with action-adventure gameplay. Battle Hub acts as an online lobby mode, using customizable player avatars from the World Tour mode, with other features set to be revealed in the future.

The main fighting gameplay of Street Fighter 6 is based around the Drive Gauge, a system designed to encourage player creativity. The gauge can be used for five different techniques, requiring players to choose which to prioritize. Most of the Drive Gauge's mechanics are based on previously existing mechanics from previous Street Fighter mainline games, such as Parry, Focus Attack, EX move, etc. The game features three control types: the "classic" control scheme has a six-button layout that functions similarly to previous entries, the "modern" control scheme assigns special moves to a single button combined with a directional input, and the "dynamic" control scheme, which is only allowed in certain parts in the Fighting Ground mode, but is not allowed in online battles, uses a single button auto attack layout, based on what range is performed.

The use of multiple super combos returns from the Street Fighter Alpha sub-series, also counting the Ultra Combo W variant from Ultra Street Fighter IV. However, each character only has three super combos based on their respective level gauge. For example, Ryu's Shinku Hadoken, Shin Hashogeki and Shin Shoryuken can only be used at Level 1, 2 and 3 respectively.

A real-time commentary system is a brand new feature in Street Fighter 6, where English and/or Japanese play-by-play and color commentators watch the action in real-time, giving it a more tournament-style feel.

Characters

The game is set to launch with a base roster of 18 characters. Characters listed in bold are new to the series.

 
 Blanka
 Cammy
 Chun-Li
 Dee Jay
 Dhalsim
 E. Honda
 Guile
 Jamie
 JP
 Juri
 Ken
 Kimberly
 Lily
 Luke
 Manon
 Marisa
 Ryu
 Zangief

Development and release
Capcom posted a "Capcom Countdown" timer on February 14, 2022, with an announcement pending once the clock finished its seven-day countdown. On February 21, 2022, Street Fighter 6 was announced, teasing the return of Ryu and Luke, the latter of whom debuted in Street Fighter Vs final downloadable content "season."

Street Fighter 6 marks as the first game since Street Fighter IV to not be developed by series producer  Yoshinori Ono, who left Capcom in 2020.

On June 2, 2022, a gameplay trailer was shown at PlayStation's June State of Play. The trailer announced the World Tour, Battle Hub, and Fighting Grounds modes, showed the return of Chun-Li, and introduced two new characters named Jamie and Kimberly. The game will be released in 2023 on PlayStation 4, PlayStation 5, Windows, and Xbox Series X/S with an in-game commentary feature, a series first. It is being developed on the RE Engine, and has been reported to support cross-platform play and rollback netcode. At The Game Awards 2022, it was announced that the game would be released on June 2, 2023.

The first closed beta took place from October 7th, 2022 to October 11th, 2022, with eight playable character, and crossplay between Xbox, PC, Steam and Playstation. The second closed beta occurred between December 16 and December 19. Applications to access the beta version were chosen by lottery.  

An arcade version was announced on December 9, 2022. Published by Taito for NESiCAxLive-compatible cabinets, it is set for 2023 release in Japan under the title Street Fighter 6 Type Arcade.

Prequel Comic 
A prequel comic book series of the same name by Udon Entertainment was announced on November 9, 2022, which explains how this game heavily focuses on Ken and Luke’s stories.

Music 
The main theme song for the game is titled "Not on the Sidelines", produced by GRP and rappers Rocco 808 and Randy Marx. The official video clip of the song also features artists Sumi Oshima and Benny Diar, and is directed and edited by Ross Harris. According to lead composer Yoshiya Terayama, the soundtrack was influenced by hip-hop culture and intended to represent "a new generation for the series." Rather than arranging motifs, the character theme songs are based on new compositions, with the concept being the characters if they appeared on the streets.

Notes

References

External links 

Upcoming video games scheduled for 2023
2.5D fighting games
Arcade video games
NESiCAxLive games
PlayStation 4 games
PlayStation 5 games
Street Fighter games
Video game sequels
Video games developed in Japan
Video games with cross-platform play
Xbox Series X and Series S games
Windows games
Open-world video games
Video games set in the United States
Video games set in Japan
Video games set in China
Video games set in Brazil
Video games set in India
Video games set in Italy
Video games set in France
Video games set in Jamaica
Video games set in Russia
Video games set in Mexico
Video games set in England
Aircraft carriers in fiction